Eyes of the Heart is a 1920 American silent crime film directed by Paul Powell and starring Mary Miles Minter. It was adapted by Clara Genevieve Kennedy from the story "Blindness" by Dana Burnet, published in the Ladies Home Journal. As is the case with many of Minter's features, it is thought to be a lost film.

Plot

As described in various film magazine reviews, Laura (Minter) is an orphan girl who has been blind since birth. She has been "adopted" by Simon (Law) and by three small-time crooks; Whitey, Sal and Mike (Burns), who is attracted to Laura. They convince the innocent Laura that her run-down surroundings are in fact beautiful.

Mike, Sal and Whitey manage to find the money to pay for an operation which restores Laura's sight. They are arrested and temporarily jailed, however, over suspicion as to how they obtained the money, which means they are not around when Laura sees for the first time. The shock of realising that the home she thought was beautiful is in fact sordid, and that her friends are criminals, causes Laura to temporarily lose her mind.

In this vulnerable state, she is taken advantage of by Sullivan (Parsons), another criminal, who convinces Laura that helping him to crack a safe will enable her to free her friends, especially Mike. While she is doing this, her friends are released due to lack of evidence, and frantically begin to search for Laura.

Just as the safe is opened, Mike arrives, and fights and overpowers Sullivan to protect Laura. By way of thanks for saving his fortune from theft, the owner of the safe gifts Laura and her friends a ranch in the country and a chance to "go straight," and the film ends with Mike and Laura together in their new life.

Cast         
Mary Miles Minter as Laura
Edmund Burns as Mike Hogan 
Lucien Littlefield as Whitey
Florence Midgley as Sal
Burton Law as Simon
John Cook as John Dunn
F. A. Turner as Dr. Dewey 
William Parsons as Dennis Sullivan
Loyola O'Connor as Mrs. Sullivan

References

External links

1920 films
1920 crime films
Films directed by Paul Powell (director)
American silent feature films
American black-and-white films
1920s English-language films
1920s American films
American crime drama films
Silent American drama films
Silent crime films